Brian O'Driscoll (born 1976) is an Irish hurler who played as a right wing-forward for the Cork senior team.

Born in Killavullen, County Cork, O'Driscoll first arrived on the inter-county scene at the age of seventeen when he first linked up with the Cork minor team, before later joining the under-21 and intermediate sides. He joined the senior panel during the 1997 championship.

At club hurling level O'Driscoll is a one-time championship medallist with divisional side Avondhu. He also won several football championship medals with Killavullen. He concluded his hurling career with St. Finbarr's.

Honours

Team

Killavullen
Cork Junior Football Championship (1): 2000

Avondhu
Cork Senior Hurling Championship (1): 1996

Cork
All-Ireland Intermediate Hurling Championship (1): 1997
Munster Intermediate Hurling Championship (2): 1997, 1999
All-Ireland Under-21 Hurling Championship (1): 1997
Munster Under-21 Hurling Championship (2): 1996, 1997
Munster Minor Hurling Championship (1): 1994

References

1977 births
Living people
Killavullen hurlers
Killavullen Gaelic footballers
Cork inter-county hurlers